Stranger Things is a 2010 British drama film directed by Eleanor Burke and Ron Eyal. It is not related to the 2016 series by the same name.  It details the bond that grows between Mani, a homeless vagrant, and Oona, a lonely woman who allows him to stay in her garden shed.  Critical reaction to the film has been positive, with The New York Times calling it "unexpectedly profound".

Plot

Cast

References

External links
 Official site
 
 
 
 

2010 films
American independent films
British independent films
American drama films
British drama films
2010 drama films
Films shot in England
Films set in England
2010 independent films
2010s English-language films
2010s American films
2010s British films